The following lists events that happened during 1973 in Cambodia.

Incumbents 
 President: Cheng Heng (until March 9), Lon Nol (starting March 9)
 Prime Minister:
 until 6 May:  Hang Thun Hak
 6 May-9 December: In Tam
 9 December-26 December: vacant
 starting 26 December: Long Boret

Events
18 March - Five members of the former Royal family were arrested following an air attack on the Presidential Palace that killed 20 people, the government also declared a state of emergency.
4 April - Cambodian National Assembly declares a state of national danger following continuation of subversive activities against the government.

See also
List of Cambodian films of 1973

References

 
1970s in Cambodia
Years of the 20th century in Cambodia
Cambodia
Cambodia